KCHS may refer to:
 Well known Catholic High School John F. Kennedy Catholic High School (Somers, New York)
 KCHS, the ICAO code for Charleston Air Force Base
 KCHS (AM), a radio station (1400 AM) licensed to Truth or Consequences, New Mexico, United States
Kalamazoo Central High School in Kalamazoo, Michigan, United States
 King City High School in King City, California, United States
 Kirtland Central High School in Kirtland, New Mexico, United States
 Knight Commander of the Equestrian Order of the Holy Sepulchre (KCHS), a Catholic chivalric order 
 Knoxville Catholic High School in Knoxville, Tennessee, United States
Kearney Catholic High School in Kearney, Nebraska, United States